Michelle Patrick (born November 20, 1949 ) is an African-American television soap opera writer.

Positions held
All My Children
 Associate Head Writer (November 1, 2005 - November 1, 2007)
 Script Writer (1990-1998; October 26, 2007 - January 3, 2008; March 24, 2008 - April 15, 2008; February 24, 2009 - June 12, 2009)

General Hospital (hired by Robert Guza Jr.)
 Associate Head Writer Writer (2001 - October 14, 2005)
 Script Writer (1998-2001)

Awards and nominations
Daytime Emmy Award
Nomination, 2000, 2003, 2004, 2005, Best Writing, General Hospital
Won, 2003, Best Writing, General Hospital
Nomination, 1991-1993, 1995-1999, Best Writing, All My Children
Won, 1998, Best Writing, All My Children
Won, 1997, Best Writing, All My Children
Won, 1996, Best Writing, All My Children

Writers Guild of America Award
Nomination, 2006, Best Writing, All My Children
Win, 1998, Best Writing, All My Children
Nomination, 1997, Best Writing, All My Children
Win, 1996, Best Writing, All My Children
Nomination, 1995, Best Writing, All My Children
Nomination, 1993, Best Writing, All My Children
Nomination, 1991, Best Writing, All My Children

External links

Patrick
American women television writers
1949 births
Living people
Writers Guild of America Award winners
Women soap opera writers
21st-century American women